John Ericsson (1883–1945) was a Swedish film and stage actor. He played the title role in the 1926 silent epic The Tales of Ensign Stål.

Selected filmography
 The Tales of Ensign Stål (1926)
 Gustaf Wasa (1928)
 Pettersson and Bendel (1933)
 Andersson's Kalle (1934)
 Järnets män (1935)
 The Count of the Old Town (1935)
 Poor Millionaires (1936)
 The Ghost of Bragehus (1936)
 The People of Bergslagen (1937)
 John Ericsson, Victor of Hampton Roads (1937)
 A Woman's Face (1938)
 The Three of Us (1940)
 Dunungen (1941)
 Goransson's Boy (1941)
 Lasse Maja (1941)
 General von Döbeln (1942)
 Ride Tonight! (1942)
 Night in Port (1943)
 There's a Fire Burning (1943)
 Life in the Country (1943)

References

Bibliography
 Klossner, Michael. The Europe of 1500-1815 on Film and Television: A Worldwide Filmography of Over 2550 Works, 1895 Through 2000. McFarland & Company, 2002.

External links

1883 births
1945 deaths
Swedish male film actors
Swedish male stage actors